Rõhu may refer to several places in Estonia:
Rõhu, Tartu County, a village
Rõhu, Järva County, a village

See also
Rohu, a species of fish of the carp family found in rivers in South Asia